Qaqinkura (Aymara for wading bird; a South American ibis (Theristicus) also spelled Caquingora) is a mountain in the eastern extensions of the Cordillera Real in the Andes of Bolivia, about  high. It is situated in the La Paz Department, Sud Yungas Province, Irupana Municipality, east of Mururata.

References 

Mountains of La Paz Department (Bolivia)